Cardington Parish, New South Wales is a civil parish of Gordon County, New South Wales, a Cadastral divisions of New South Wales.

The  parish is on the Bell River and the nearest large town is Wellington, New South Wales north of the parish.

References

Parishes of Gordon County (New South Wales)